The Tosor is a river in Tong District and Jeti-Ögüz District of Issyk-Kul Region of Kyrgyzstan. It takes its rise on the north slopes of Teskey Ala-Too and falls into the lake Issyk-Kul. The river is fed by mixed sources of snow and glacier ice meltwater (85%) and rainfall (15%). Average annual discharge is 2.28 m³/s, and during low water period from January to March - 1.0 m³/s. The maximum flow is 65 m³/s and the minimum - 0.4 m³/s. The river is used for irrigation.

References

Rivers of Kyrgyzstan
Tributaries of Issyk-Kul